Karni Bhawan Palace is a former residential palace of the king of the former Bikaner state Maharaja Karni Singh. It was built in the deluxe art deco style which was popular in the 1940s in the US and Europe.

Notes

Buildings and structures in Bikaner